The common eider (pronounced ) (Somateria mollissima), also called St. Cuthbert's duck or Cuddy's duck, is a large ( in body length) sea-duck that is distributed over the northern coasts of Europe, North America and eastern Siberia. It breeds in Arctic and some northern temperate regions, but winters somewhat farther south in temperate zones, when it can form large flocks on coastal waters.

The eider's nest is built close to the sea and is lined with eiderdown, plucked from the female's breast. This soft and warm lining has long been harvested for filling pillows and quilts, but in more recent years has been largely replaced by down from domestic farm-geese and synthetic alternatives. Although eiderdown pillows or quilts are now a rarity, eiderdown harvesting continues and is sustainable, as it can be done after the ducklings leave the nest with no harm to the birds.

Taxonomy
The common eider was formally named by the Swedish naturalist Carl Linnaeus in 1758 in the tenth edition of his Systema Naturae. He placed it with all the other ducks in the genus Anas and coined the binomial name Anas mollissima. It is now placed with two other species in the genus Somateria that was introduced in 1819 by the English zoologist William Leach. The genus name is derived from Ancient Greek  : sōma "body" (stem somat-) and  : erion "wool". The specific mollissimus is Latin meaning "very soft". Both parts of the name refer to its down feathers.

Six subspecies are recognised:
 S. m. v-nigrum Bonaparte & Gray, GR, 1855 – breeds in northeast Asia and Alaska; winters in the Bering Sea and the Aleutian Islands
 S. m. borealis (Brehm, CL, 1824) – breeds in northeast Canada, Greenland and Iceland; winters in the north Atlantic
 S. m. sedentaria Snyder, 1941 – breeds in Hudson Bay and James Bay (Canada) 
 S. m. dresseri Sharpe, 1871 – breeds in southeast Canada and northeast USA; winters around northwest Atlantic coasts
 S. m. faeroeensis Brehm, CL, 1831 – Faroe Islands
 S. m. mollissima (Linnaeus, 1758) – breeds in northwest Eurasia; winters in northwest and central Europe

Description

The common eider is both the largest of the four eider species and the largest duck found in Europe, and is exceeded in North America only by smatterings of the Muscovy duck, which only reaches North America in a wild state in southernmost Texas (and arguably south Florida where feral but non-native populations reside). It is characterized by its bulky shape and large, wedge-shaped bill. The male is unmistakable, with its black and white plumage and green nape. The female is a brown bird, but can still be readily distinguished from all ducks, except other eider species, on the basis of size and head shape. The drake's display call is a strange almost human-like "ah-ooo", while the hen utters hoarse quacks. The species is often readily approachable.

Drakes of the European, eastern North American and Asia/western North American races can be distinguished by minor differences in plumage and bill colour. Some authorities place the subspecies v-nigra as a separate species.

This species dives for crustaceans and molluscs, with mussels being a favoured food. The eider will eat mussels by swallowing them whole; the shells are then crushed in their gizzard and excreted. When eating a crab, the eider will remove all of its claws and legs, and then eat the body in a similar fashion.

It is abundant, with populations of about 1.5–2 million birds in both North America and Europe, and also large but unknown numbers in eastern Siberia (HBW).

A particularly famous colony of eiders lives on the Farne Islands in Northumberland, England. These birds were the subject of one of the first ever bird protection laws, established by Saint Cuthbert in the year 676. About 1,000 pairs still nest there every year. Because St. Cuthbert is the patron saint of Northumberland, it was natural that the eider should be chosen as the county's emblem bird; the birds are still often called Cuddy's ducks in the area, "Cuddy" being the familiar form of "Cuthbert".

In Canada's Hudson Bay, important eider die-offs were observed in the 1990s by local populations due to quickly changing ice flow patterns. The Canadian Wildlife Service has spent several years gathering up-to-date information on their populations, and preliminary results seem to show a population recovery. The common eider is the object of the 2011 documentary People of a Feather, which studies the historical relationship between the Sanikiluaq community and eiders, as well as various aspects of their ecology.

The common eider is one of the species to which the Agreement on the Conservation of African-Eurasian Migratory Waterbirds (AEWA) applies.

Social behaviour
Eiders are colonial breeders. They nest on coastal islands in colonies ranging in size of less than 100 to upwards of 15,000 individuals. Female eiders frequently exhibit a high degree of natal philopatry, where they return to breed on the same island where they were hatched. This can lead to a high degree of relatedness between individuals nesting on the same island, as well as the development of kin-based female social structures. This relatedness has likely played a role in the evolution of co-operative breeding behaviours amongst eiders. Examples of these behaviours include laying eggs in the nests of related individuals and crèching, where female eiders team up and share the work of rearing ducklings.

Gallery

References

External links

 Common Eider Species Account – Cornell Lab of Ornithology
 Massachusetts Breeding Bird Atlas – Common Eider
 
 Eider Duck Hunting information and pictures.
 YouTube video of Eider eating a crab
 Feathers of Common Eider (Somateria molissima)
 
 
 
 

common eider
Holarctic birds
common eider
common eider
Articles containing video clips